The 2022 National Lacrosse League season, formally known as the 2021–2022 season, was the 35th in the history of the NLL. The season began on December 3, 2021 and ended with the NLL final in late spring of 2022. This was the inaugural season for the expansion team Panther City Lacrosse Club, and the Albany FireWolves who relocated from New England. The NLL returned after missing a season due to the COVID-19 pandemic.

The Colorado Mammoth defeated the Buffalo Bandits in a best of three series to win its first championship since 2006.

The 2022 season was the start of a multi-year broadcasting deal with ESPN.

Regular season

Playoffs

*Overtime

Awards

Annual awards

Stadiums and locations

Attendance

See also
 2022 in sports

References

National Lacrosse League
National Lacrosse League seasons